In mathematics, a fence, also called a zigzag poset, is a partially ordered set (poset) in which the order relations form a path with alternating orientations:

or

A fence may be finite, or it may be formed by an infinite alternating sequence extending in both directions. The incidence posets of path graphs form examples of fences.

A linear extension of a fence is called an alternating permutation; André's problem of counting the number of different linear extensions has been studied since the 19th century. The solutions to this counting problem, the so-called Euler zigzag numbers or up/down numbers, are:

.

The number of antichains in a fence is a Fibonacci number; the distributive lattice with this many elements, generated from a fence via Birkhoff's representation theorem, has as its graph the Fibonacci cube.

A partially ordered set is series-parallel if and only if it does not have four elements forming a fence.

Several authors have also investigated the number of order-preserving maps from fences to themselves, or to fences of other sizes.

An up-down poset  is a generalization of a zigzag poset in which there are  downward orientations for every upward one and  total elements. For instance,  has the elements and relations

In this notation, a fence is a partially ordered set of the form .

Equivalent conditions
The following conditions are equivalent for a poset :
 is a disjoint union of zigzag posets.
 has dimension at most one (defined analogously to the Krull dimension of a commutative ring).
The slice category  is cartesian closed.

The prime ideals of a commutative ring , ordered by inclusion, satisfy the equivalent conditions above if and only if  has Krull dimension at most one.

Notes

References 

 .
 .
 .
 .
 .
 .
 .
 .
 .
 .
 .
  Exercise 3.23a, page 157.
 .

External links 
 

Order theory
Enumerative combinatorics